Frode Larsen (16 June 1949 − 20 June 2017) was a Norwegian footballer who played for SK Brann as a right-winger. He played a total of 211 first-team games for the club between 1967 and 1979, scoring 26 goals. He was also capped seven times by Norway.

He was a member of the Brann teams that won the Norwegian Cup in 1972 and 1976.

References

1949 births
2017 deaths
Norwegian footballers
SK Brann players
Norway international footballers
Footballers from Bergen
Association football midfielders